Sherkat-e Qeshlaq-e Mahar (also Romanized as Sherkat-e Qeshlāq-e Mahar) is a village in Hakimabad Rural District, in the Central District of Zarandieh County, Markazi Province, Iran. At the 2006 census, its population was 11, in 4 families.

References 

Populated places in Zarandieh County